ANNA 1B (acronym for "Army, Navy, NASA, Air Force") was a United States satellite launched on October 31, 1962, from Cape Canaveral, on a Thor rocket.

Features

ANNA 1B's predecessor launched on May 10, 1962, but failed to reach orbit.

ANNA 1B was a US Navy geodetic satellite launched from Cape Canaveral by a Thor Able Star rocket. The mission profile involved ANNA serving as a reference for making precise geodetic surveys, allowing measurement of the force and direction of the gravity field of Earth, locating the middle of land masses and establishing surface positions.

ANNA 1B was spherically shaped with a diameter of 0.91 meters and a weight of 161 kg. It was powered by a band of solar cells located around its equator supported by nickel-cadmium batteries. A communications antenna was wrapped around the spiral surface of the satellite.

The ship's instrumentation included optical systems, radio location, and Doppler radar. The optical system consisted of a high intensity beacon which transmits a series of five flashes with a period of 5.6 seconds. This allowed one to accurately measure land masses by ground-to-sky satellite photographs (optical tracking or stellar triangulation). The Doppler radar system could also be programmed from the ground control station and allowed geopositioning with an accuracy of 20 meters or less.

References

Bibliography
 Bramschere, Robert G (1980). "A Survey of Launch Vehicle Failures". Spaceflight 22: 351.

External links
 NASA/MOTS OPTICAL OBSERVATIONS OF THE ANNA IB SATELLITE. (PDF)

1962 in spaceflight
Geodetic satellites
Satellites of the United States